Elektro Soukouss is the second studio album by Jessy Matador. It was released on 14 June 2010. It peaked at number 42 on the French Albums Chat.

Singles
"Allez Ola Olé" was the first single released from the album; it was released on 10 May 2010. Jessy Matador sang the song at the Eurovision Song Contest 2010 for France in the final Jessy scored 82 points and finished 12th, it reached number 1 on the French Singles Chart.
"Dansez" was the second single released from the album; it was released on 24 January 2011; it reached number 86 on the French Singles Chart.

Track listing

Chart performance

Release history

References

External links

Jessy Matador albums
2010 albums